The Scout and Guide movement in Artsakh is served by at least two minor organizations, including: Armenian General Benevolent Union Scouts and "Hayk's Generation" Haiky Serund NGO Հայկի Սերունդ ԵՀԿ.

History 
In 1994 the first Scout gathering was held at the initiative of Armenian Revolutionary Federation Artsakh Central Committee. There were further Scout gatherings until 1999. Some time later, the Scout movement revived with the cooperation of "Raffi Union" of Tehran and the youth organization "Hayk's Generation". The third All Armenian Scout Jamboree "Hayordiner" was held in Shoushi.

However, being in an Armenian break away region internationally recognized as part of Azerbaijan, the legal status of these organizations is unclear.

External links

 http://agbu.org/program/scouts/
 http://www.agbu.am/en/children-youth-3/scout-movement/1060-hayordiner-banakum-2
 http://www.agbu.am/en/children-youth-3/scout-movement/1067-agbu-arcaxi-banakum-1

Artsakh
Republic of Artsakh